A hollow post mill at the Netherlands Open Air Museum, Arnhem, Gelderland, Netherlands was originally built at Gouda, South Holland, Netherlands. It was dismantled in 1946 and re-erected at the museum. The mill has been restored to working order.

History
The mill was originally built to drain the Oude en Nieuwe Goudse Polder at Gouda, South Holland. It was dismantled in 1946 and re-erected at the Netherlands Open Air Museum, Arnhem, Gelderland. The mill was restored to working order in 2009.

Description

The mill is what the Dutch describe as a Weidemolen. It is a small hollow post mill on a roundhouse. The mill is winded by tail vane. The buck and roundhouse are covered in boards. The sails are Common sails. The sails are carried on a wooden windshaft. The windshaft carries the brake wheel which has 32 cogs. This drives the wallower (9 cogs) at  the top of the upright shaft. At the bottom of the upright shaft a centrifugal pump is driven.

Public access
The mill can be viewed externally during museum opening hours.

See also
Windmills in Arnhem
De Hoop
De Kroon

Windmills in the Netherlands Open Air Museum
Boktjasjker
Het Fortuyn
Huizermolen
Mijn Genoegen
Spinnenkop
Arnhem post mill (1989)
Arnhem smock mill (1960)

References

External links

Openluchtmuseum webpage about the mill 

Windmills in Gelderland
Windmills completed in 1946
Post mills in the Netherlands
Windpumps in the Netherlands
Agricultural buildings in the Netherlands
Buildings and structures in Arnhem